Cryptoblepharus leschenault is a species of lizard in the family Scincidae. The species is endemic to Indonesia.

Etymology
The specific name, leschenault, is in honor of French biologist Jean-Baptiste Leschenault de La Tour, who collected the holotype.

Habitat
The preferred natural habitat of C. leschenault is forest.

Reproduction
C. leschenault is oviparous.

References

Further reading
Cocteau JT (1832). "Ablepharis". Magasin de Zoologie 2: classe 3, point 1. (Ablepharis lechenault, new species, six unnumbered pages + plate). (in French and Latin).

Cryptoblepharus
Reptiles of Indonesia
Endemic fauna of Indonesia
Reptiles described in 1832
Taxa named by Jean Theodore Cocteau